Sebastian Leszczak (born January 20, 1992 in Kraków) is a Polish professional footballer who last played as a forward for Sandecja Nowy Sącz.

Career
Previously he played for Wisła Kraków, making his Ekstraklasa debut in November 2009. His contract with the club expired at the start of 2010. In January 2010, the club attempted to suspend him for half a year for training with another club, however the PZPN overturned the decision on appeal in March. In June, he signed a three-year contract with the newly promoted Ekstraklasa side Górnik Zabrze.

References

External links
 

1992 births
Living people
Wisła Kraków players
Górnik Zabrze players
Sandecja Nowy Sącz players
Ekstraklasa players
Polish footballers
Footballers from Kraków
Association football forwards